Rattaphum is a district (amphoe) of Songkhla province, southern Thailand.

Geography
Neighboring districts are (from the east clockwise): Khuan Niang, Bang Klam, and Hat Yai of Songkhla Province; Khuan Kalong of Satun province; and Pa Bon of Phatthalung province.

History
The district was renamed from Kamphaeng Phet to Rattaphum in 1939.

Administration

Central administration 
Rattaphum is divided into five sub-districts (tambons), which are further subdivided into 63 administrative villages (mubans).

Missing numbers are tambon which now form Khuan Niang District.

Local administration 
There is one town (Thesaban Mueang) in the district:
 Kamphaeng Phet consisting of parts of sub-district Kamphaeng Phet.

There are three sub-district municipalities (thesaban tambon) in the district:
 Kamphaeng Phet consisting of parts of sub-district Kamphaeng Phet.
 Na Si Thong consisting of parts of sub-district Khao Phra.
 Khuha Tai consisting of sub-district Khuha Tai.

There are three sub-district administrative organizations (SAO) in the district:
 Tha Chamuang consisting of sub-district Tha Chamuang.
 Khuan Ru consisting of sub-district Khuan Ru.
 Khao Phra consisting of parts of sub-district Khao Phra.

References

External links
amphoe.com

Districts of Songkhla province